TID is a Bongo Flava musician from Tanzania, whose real name is Khalid Mohamed (born 1981 in Dar es Salaam). TID is an acronym of Top in Dar, in which "Dar" refers to Dar es Salaam, his hometown. He is best known for his hits "kiuno" "Nyota yako" "We dada" "Zeze" and "Siamini".

Biography 

He started singing in 1994 with a group known as Black Gangsters. He turned solo five years later. At the age of 21 he signed with Poa Records. His first single "Mrembo" was released in March 2002. He did also act the main role on the film "Girlfriend", a film about the Bongo Flava scene.

He has toured in East African countries, United Kingdom and United States. He performs with a live band called Top Band.

His hit "Zeze" is included in the Global Soul compilation by Putumayo World Music.

In 2008 he was sentenced for one year in prison for an assault. He was released four months later.

In May, 2010, it was reported that he was assaulted by professional basketball player Hasheem Thabeet in a night club in Tanzania. Thabeet, through his agent, has denied being involved with any altercation that night although he was present at the night club.

Discography 
"Sauti ya Dhahabu" (2002)
"Burudani (2005)
"Kiuno Viuono" (2012)
"The Vocalist (2019)

Awards 
2003 Tanzania Music Awards - Best Male Artist & Best R&B Artist 
2005 Kisima Music Awards - Best Artist/Group from Tanzania 	
2008 Kisima Music Awards - Video of the Year from Tanzania ("Nyota Yako")

References

External links 
TID Myspace profile
The Leopard Man's African Music Guide

1981 births
Tanzanian rappers
21st-century Tanzanian male singers
Living people
Tanzanian Bongo Flava musicians
 Tanzanian hip hop musicians
 Swahili-language singers